Sargerefteh-ye Sofla (also Romanized as Sargerefteh-ye Soflá and Sar Gerefteh-ye Soflá; also known as Sargarift Sufla, Sar Garīseh-ye Pā’īn, Sar Gerefteh, Sar Gerefteh-ye Pā’īn, Sar Gereft-e Pā’īn, and Sargerīseh-ye Pā’īn) is a village in Razan Rural District, Zagheh District, Khorramabad County, Lorestan Province, Iran. At the 2006 census, its population was 245, in 53 families.

References 

Towns and villages in Khorramabad County